Agrupació Sagrada Familia Esportiva Recreativa i Cultural de Terrassa, better known as SFERIC Terrassa, is a Catalan sports club from Terrassa, Vallès Occidental. It was founded in 1932 in Terrassa's Ca n'Aurell district's Sagrada Familia church as a basketball club, originally named simply Sagrada Familia de Terrassa. In 1950 a rink hockey section was added. The club is nowadays best known for its women's rink hockey's side, which plays in the OK Liga, the premier national category.

Season to season

Women's team

References

External links
Official hockey website
Official basketball website

Terrassa
Sports clubs established in 1932
Sports clubs in Barcelona
Catalan rink hockey clubs
Catalan basketball teams